Whistled languages use whistling to emulate speech and facilitate communication. A whistled language is a system of whistled communication which allows fluent whistlers to transmit and comprehend a potentially unlimited number of messages over long distances. Whistled languages are different in this respect from the restricted codes sometimes used by herders or animal trainers to transmit simple messages or instructions.  Generally, whistled languages emulate the tones or vowel formants of a natural spoken language, as well as aspects of its intonation and prosody, so that trained listeners who speak that language can understand the encoded message.

Whistled language is rare compared to spoken language, but it is found in cultures around the world. It is especially common in tone languages where the whistled tones transmit the tones of the syllables (tone melodies of the words). This might be because in tone languages the tone melody carries more of the functional load of communication while non-tonal phonology carries proportionally less. The genesis of a whistled language has never been recorded in either case and has not yet received much productive study.

History 

One of the earliest records of whistled speech may be in Xenophon's Anabasis. While travelling through the territory of an ancient tribe on the southern Black Sea coast in 400 B.C.E he writes that the inhabitants could hear one another at great distances across the valleys. The same area encompasses the Turkish village of Kuşköy where whistled speech (kuş dili) is practiced today.

In early China, the technique of transcendental whistling was a kind of nonverbal language with affinities to the spiritual aspects of Daoist meditation.

In 1982 in the Greek village of Antia on Euboea island, the entire population knew the local whistled speech called sfyria, but only a few whistlers remain now.

Causes of whistled language development

Ecology 

Whistle languages have naturally developed in response to the necessity for humans to communicate in conditions of relative isolation, with possible causes being distance, noise levels, and night, as well as specific activities, such as social information, shepherding, hunting, fishing, courtship, or shamanism. Because of this usage, they are mostly related to places with mountains or dense forests. Southern China, Papua New Guinea, the Amazon forest, subsaharan Africa, Mexico, and Europe encompass most of these locations.

They have been more recently found in dense forests like the Amazon where they may replace spoken dialogue in the villages while hunting or fishing to overcome the pressure of the acoustic environment. More specifically, whistle speech can reach a loudness of 130 dB, and the transmission range can reach up to 10 km (as verified in La Gomera, Canary Island). The long range of whistling is enhanced by the mountainous terrain found in areas where whistled languages are used. Many areas with such languages work hard to preserve their ancient traditions, in the face of rapidly advancing telecommunications systems in many areas.

Culture 

In some cases (e.g. Chinantec) the whistled speech is an important and integral part of the language and culture; in others (e.g. Nahuatl) its role is much lesser. Whistled speech may be very central and highly valued in a culture. Shouting is very rare in  Sochiapam Chinantec. Men in that culture are subject to being fined if they do not handle whistle-speech well enough to perform certain town jobs. They may whistle for fun in situations where spoken speech could easily be heard.

In Sochiapam, Oaxaca, and other places in Mexico, and reportedly in West and Southern Africa as well (specifically among the VhaVenda), whistled speech is men's language: although women may understand it, they do not use it.

Though whistled languages are not secret codes or secret languages (with the exception of a whistled language used by ñañigos insurgencies in Cuba during Spanish occupation), they may be used for secretive communication among outsiders or others who do not know or understand the whistled language though they may understand its spoken origin. Stories are told of farmers in Aas during World War II, or in La Gomera, who were able to hide evidence of such nefarious activities as milk-watering because they were warned in whistle-speech that the police were approaching.

Characteristics of whistled languages

Tonal and non-tonal whistle languages 

Whistled languages differ according to whether the spoken language is tonal or not, with the whistling being either tone or articulation based (or both). Most whistle languages, of which there are several hundred, are based on tonal languages.

A way in which true whistled languages differ from other types of whistled communication is that they encode auditory features of spoken languages by transposing key components of speech sounds. There are two types of whistled languages: those based on non-tone languages, which transpose F2 patterns (dealing with formants), and those based on tone languages, which transpose tone melodies. However, both types of whistle tones have a phonological structure that is related to the spoken language that they are transposing.

Tonal languages are often stripped of articulation, leaving only suprasegmental features such as duration and tone, and when whistled retain the spoken melodic line. Thus whistled tonal languages convey phonemic information solely through tone, length, and, to a lesser extent, stress, and most segmental phonemic distinctions of the spoken language are lost.

In non-tonal languages, more of the articulatory features of speech are retained, and the normally timbral variations imparted by the movements of the tongue and soft palate are transformed into pitch variations. Certain consonants can be pronounced while whistling, so as to modify the whistled sound, much as consonants in spoken language modify the vowel sounds adjacent to them.

Different whistling styles may be used in a single language. Sochiapam Chinantec has three different words for whistle-speech: sie3 for whistling with the tongue against the alveolar ridge, jui̵32 for bilabial whistling, and juo2 for finger-in-the-mouth whistling. These are used for communication over varying distances. There is also a kind of loud falsetto (hóh32) which functions in some ways like whistled speech.

Tonal whistle languages and types of tones 

Most whistle languages, of which there are several hundred, are based on tonal languages.

Only the tone of the speech is saved in the whistle, while aspects as articulation and phonation are eliminated. These are replaced by other features such as stress and rhythmical variations. However, some languages, like that of the Zezuru who speak a Shona-derived dialect, include articulation so that consonants interrupt the flow of the whistle. A similar language is the Tsonga whistle language used in the highlands in the Southern parts of Mozambique. This should not be confused with the whistled sibilants of Shona.

There are two different types of whistle tones - hole tones and edge tones. A hole (or 'orifice') tone is produced by a fast-moving cylinder (or 'vena contracta') of air that interacts with the slow-moving anulus of air surrounding it. Instability in the boundary layer leads to perturbations that increase in size until a feedback path is established whereby specific frequencies of the resonance chamber are emphasized. An edge tone, on the other hand, is generated by a thin jet of air that strikes an obstacle. Vortices are shed near the point of disturbance in the flow, alternating on each side of the obstacle or 'wedge'.

In Canary Islands, Silbo on the island of La Gomera, based on Spanish, is one of the best-studied whistled languages (Rialland 2005). The number of distinctive sounds or phonemes in this language is a matter of disagreement, varying according to the researcher from two to five vowels and four to nine consonants. This variation may reflect differences in speakers' abilities as well as in the methods used to elicit contrasts. The work of Meyer clarifies this debate by providing the first statistical analyses of production for various whistlers as well as psycholinguistic tests of vowel identification.

Non-tonal whistle languages 

In a non-tonal language, segments may be differentiated as follows:

Vowels are replaced by a set of relative pitch ranges generally tracking the f2 formant of spoken language.

Stress is expressed by higher pitch or increased length

Consonants are produced by pitch transitions of different lengths and height, plus the presence or absence of occlusion. ("Labial stops are replaced by diaphragm or glottal occlusions.")

Sound production techniques 

Whistling techniques do not require the vibration of the vocal cords: they produce a shock effect of the compressed air stream inside the cavity of the mouth and/or of the hands. When the jaws are fixed by a finger, the size of the hole is stable. The air stream expelled makes vibrations at the edge of the mouth. The faster the air stream is expelled, the higher is the noise inside the cavities. If the hole (mouth) and the cavity (intra-oral volume) are well matched, the resonance is tuned, and the whistle is projected more loudly. The frequency of this bioacoustical phenomenon is modulated by the morphing of the resonating cavity that can be, to a certain extent, related to the articulation of the equivalent spoken form. "Apart from the five vowel-phonemes [of Silbo Gomero]—and even these do not invariably have a fixed or steady pitch—all whistled speech-sound realizations are glides which are interpreted in terms of range, contour, and steepness."

Bilabial and labiodental techniques 

There are a few different techniques of how to produce whistle speech, the choice of which is dependent on practical concerns. Bilabial and labiodental techniques are common for short and medium distance discussions (in a market, in the noise of a room, or for hunting); whereas the tongue retroflexed, one or two fingers introduced in the mouth, a blow concentrated at the junction between two fingers or the lower lip pulled while breathing in air are techniques used to reach high levels of power for long distance speaking. Each place has its favorite trend that depends on the most common use of the village and on the personal preferences of each whistler. Whistling with a leaf or a flute is often related to courtship or poetic expression (reported in the Kickapoo language in Mexico and in the Hmong and Akha cultures in Asia).

Physics 

"All whistled languages share one basic characteristic: they function by varying the frequency of a simple wave-form as a function of time, generally with minimal dynamic variations, which is readily understandable since in most cases their only purpose is long-distance communication." A whistled tone is essentially a simple oscillation (or sine wave), and thus timbral variations are impossible. Normal articulation during an ordinary lip-whistle is relatively easy though the lips move little causing a constant of labialization and making labial and labiodental consonants (p, b, m, f, etc.) problematical.

Comparison with spoken languages

Limited expressivity 

The expressivity of whistled speech is likely to be somewhat limited compared to spoken speech (although not inherently so), but such a conclusion should not be taken as absolute, as it depends heavily on various factors including the phonology of the language. For example, in some tonal languages with few tones, whistled messages typically consist of stereotyped or otherwise standardized expressions, are elaborately descriptive, and often have to be repeated. However, in heavily tonal languages such as Mazatec and Yoruba, a large amount of information is conveyed through pitch even when spoken, and therefore extensive conversations may be whistled. In any case, even for non-tonal languages, measurements indicate that high intelligibility can be achieved with whistled speech (90%) of intelligibility of non-standardized sentences for Greek and the equivalent for Turkish.

Lack of comprehension 

The lack of understanding can be seen with a confusion matrix. It was tested using two speakers of Silbo (Jampolsky 1999). The study revealed that generally, the vowels were relatively easy to understand, and the consonants a bit more difficult.

 Confusion matrix of the vowels in the perception test. 'Produced' vowels are displayed horizontally and 'perceived' vowels vertically (Numbers in bold correspond to correct identifications).

 Confusion matrix of the consonants in the perception test. 'Produced' consonants are displayed horizontally and 'perceived' consonants vertically. (Numbers in bold correspond to correct identifications).

List of whistled languages 

The following list is of languages that exist or existed in a whistled form, or of ethnic groups that speak such languages.

 Africa
 Cameroon: Gbaya, Doohwaayo, Mofu
 Ethiopia: Bench, Oyda
 Ghana: Nchumburu
 Mozambique: Shona-derived dialect and similar Tsonga language
 Nigeria: Yoruba
 South Africa: Southern Bantu
 West Africa: Bafia, Bape, Birifor, Bobo, Burunsi, Daguri, Diola, Ewe, Fongbe, Marka, Ngwe, Twi, Tshi, Ule (among others)
 Americas
 Alaska: Yupik
 Bolivia: Sirionó
 Brazil: Pirahã 
 Colombia: Desano
 Mexico: Amuzgo, Chinantec, Ch'ol, Kickapoo, Mazatec, Nahuatl, Otomi, Sayula Popoluca, Tepehua, Totonac, Zapotec, whistled Spanish in Tlaxcala
 United States: Taos
 Asia
 China: Akha in Yunnan Province, Hmong and Bai.
 Burma: Chin
 India: Kongthong village of Meghalaya). 
 Laos: Akha, and Hmong
 Myanmar: Akha, and Hmong
 Nepal: Chepang
 St. Lawrence Island: for Siberian Yupik inhabitants, see Yupik, Alaska in America mentioned above.
 Thailand: Akha, and Hmong
 Vietnam: Hmong
 Europe 
 Greece (village of Antia on the island of Euboea): Sfyria
 France (village of Aas, Pyrenees): Occitan language 
 Spain (La Gomera and El Hierro, Canary Islands): El Silbo ("Silbo Gomero")
 Turkey: Turkish bird language (village of Kuşköy(tr))
 Oceania
 New Guinea: Yopno, Gadsup, Binumarien, Abau, Polopa, Telefol, Bauzi, (possibly Tairora and Narak, in the latter reportedly linked with the spirits talking)

Other means of expressing speech 

In continental Africa, speech may be conveyed by a whistle or other musical instrument, most famously the "talking drums". However, while drums may be used by griots singing praise songs or for inter-village communication, and other instruments may be used on the radio for station identification jingles, for regular conversation at a distance whistled speech is used. As two people approach each other, one may even switch from whistled to spoken speech in mid-sentence.

See also 

 Musical language
 Language of the birds
 Solresol
 Kickapoo whistled speech
 Sweep (puppet)
 Clangers, stop motion animation characters using a whistled language.
 Whistled fricative

References

Bibliography 

 Foris, David Paul. 2000. A grammar of Sochiapam Chinantec. Studies in Chinantec languages 6. Dallas: SIL International and UT Arlington.

External links 

 Whistles in the Mist: Whistled Speech in Oaxaca, Mexico "In the Americas with David Yetman" documentary in which Georgetown University linguist Mark Sicoli conducts fieldwork with speaker/whistlers of Sochiápam Chinantec
 The World Whistles Network An international network of research and defense on whistled languages
 A whistled conversation in Sochiapam Chinantec (SIL-Mexico)
 Whistling to Communicate in Alaska from NPR
 Link to ELAR documentation of Antia Whistling language
 MP3 File of a Voice of America Broadcast - UN: Technology Threatens Whistled Language in Turkey - January 12, 2018

 
History of telecommunications

de:Pfeifen#Gepfiffene Sprachen